The Dodge Hornet may refer to:

 Dodge Hornet, a 2023 version of the Alfa Romeo Tonale for the North American market
 Dodge Hornet (concept car), designed in 2006